Always is a 1989 American romantic fantasy drama film directed by Steven Spielberg, and starring Richard Dreyfuss, Holly Hunter, John Goodman, Brad Johnson and Audrey Hepburn in her final film role.

Always is a remake of the 1943 romantic drama A Guy Named Joe set during World War II. The main departure from the 1943 film is the changing of the setting from wartime to a modern aerial firefighting operation. The film, however, follows the same basic plot line: the spirit of a recently dead expert pilot mentors a newer pilot, while watching him fall in love with the girlfriend he left behind. The names of the four principal characters of the earlier film are all the same, with the exception of the Ted Randall character, who is called Ted Baker in the remake, and Pete's last name is Sandich instead of Sandidge.

The film was released by Universal Pictures in the United States on December 22, 1989, the same day as Tango & Cash. Both films were the last to be released by Hollywood in the 1980s.

Plot 
Pete Sandich is an aerial firefighter whose excessive risk taking in the air deeply troubles his girlfriend, Dorinda Durston, a pilot who doubles as an air traffic controller for the fire fighters. It also concerns Pete's best friend, Al Yackey, a fellow firefighter pilot.

After yet another risky and nearly fatal flight that Pete casually shrugs off, Al suggests he accept a safer job training firefighting pilots in Flat Rock, Colorado. Pete refuses until Dorinda tearfully confronts him, confessing her perpetual fear and anguish that he will be killed. Pete relents and tells Dorinda he will take the training job.

Pete flies one last mission, despite Dorinda's gloomy premonition. During the fire bombing run, Al's engine catches fire and is about to explode. Pete makes a dangerously steep dive and skillfully douses Al's engine with a fire-retardant slurry, saving Al. As Pete struggles to regain control from the dive, he flies directly through the forest fire, igniting his own engine and causing the aircraft to explode.

Pete strolls through a burnt-out forest. Coming to a small clearing, he meets Hap, who explains Pete died in the explosion and now has a new purpose: As spirits did for him during his lifetime, he will provide Spiritus ("the divine breath") to guide others who will interpret his words as their own thoughts.

Although time is non-linear from Pete's perspective, six months have elapsed in the real world  and Al wants a grieving Dorinda to move past Pete's death. He takes her with him to Colorado to work at the flight school where Pete was to command pilots who will be training to fight fires, one of which is Ted Baker. More months pass and, to Pete's anguish, Ted falls in love with Dorinda as she begins emerging from her year-long mourning. Pete attempts to sabotage the budding romance, but Hap reminds him that his life ended; he was sent to inspire Ted, but also to bid Dorinda farewell.

Ted, with Pete's inspiration, plans a dangerous rescue mission of trapped firefighters. Unable to bear another loss, Dorinda takes Ted's aircraft to do the job herself. Pete, unseen by Dorinda, fails to dissuade her. However, with Pete's guidance, Dorinda is able to save the firefighters who are trapped on the ground. On the return flight, Pete tells her everything he wanted to say in life.

Dorinda makes an emergency water landing in a lake. As the sinking plane's cockpit floods, Dorinda seems reluctant to escape. Pete appears before her and, offering his hand, leads her to the surface. As Dorinda, now alone, wades ashore, Pete releases her heart to allow Ted to replace him.

Dorinda walks back to the airbase and embraces Ted. Pete smiles and heads in the opposite direction to assume his place in the hereafter.

Cast 
 Richard Dreyfuss as Pete Sandich
 Holly Hunter as Dorinda Durston
 John Goodman as Al Yackey
 Brad Johnson as Ted Baker
 Audrey Hepburn as "Hap"
 Roberts Blossom as Dave
 Keith David as "Powerhouse"
 Ed Van Nuys as "Nails"
 Marg Helgenberger as Rachel
 Dale Dye as Don
 Brian Haley as Alex
 James Lashly as Charlie
 Michael Steve Jones as Grey
 Doug McGrath as Bus Driver

Production 
Spielberg confided that while making Jaws in 1974, he and Dreyfuss had traded quips from A Guy Named Joe, considered a "classic" war film, that they both wanted to remake. As an "inside joke," a clip from A Guy Named Joe is included in a scene in Poltergeist, which Spielberg had produced. Dreyfuss had seen the 1943 melodrama "at least 35 times." For Spielberg, who recalled seeing it as a child late at night, "it was one of the films that inspired him to become a movie director," creating an emotional connection to the times that his father, a wartime air force veteran had lived through. The two friends quoted individual shots from the film to each other and when the opportunity arose, years later, were resolved to recreate the wartime fantasy.

Dustin Hoffman was offered a role but turned it down.

Principal photography began on May 15, 1989; production took place in northwestern Montana in the Kootenai National Forest, with some scenes filmed in and around Libby. Some 500 of its residents were recruited for the film as extras to act as wildland firefighters. The scenes where the plane flies over the lake at the beginning and lands in the lake at the end of the movie were filmed at Bull Lake, south of Troy. The scenes set in "Flat Rock, Colorado," were filmed at and around the Ephrata airport in eastern Washington. The scene where Pete and Hap are walking through the wheat field was filmed at Sprague, southwest of Spokane, where they spent two weeks filming in June. Footage of Yellowstone National Park's 1988 fires was used for the fire sequences. Production wrapped in August 1989. Hepburn retired from acting and died in 1993.

Aircraft used 
Two Douglas A-26 Invader fire bombers (Douglas B-26C Invader No. 57] and Douglas TB-26C Invader No. 59) were prominently featured in Always. The flying for the film was performed by well-known film pilot Steve Hinton and Dennis Lynch, the owner of the A-26s.

A number of other aircraft also appeared in Always: Aeronca 7AC Champion, Bellanca 8KCAB Super Decathlon, Beechcraft Model 18, Cessna 337 Super Skymaster, Cessna 340, Consolidated PBY-5A Catalina, de Havilland Canada DHC-6-300 Twin Otter, Douglas C-54 Skymaster, Fairchild C-119C Flying Boxcar, McDonnell Douglas DC-10 and North American B-25J Mitchell. Two helicopters were also seen: Bell 206 JetRanger and Bell UH-1B Iroquois.

Release 
Always opened at #5 at that week's box office, grossing $3,713,480, competing with Christmas Vacation, Tango & Cash (opening the same weekend), The War of the Roses and Back to the Future Part II. Although now considered only a modest financial success when compared to other Spielberg ventures, the film brought back returns grossing $43,858,790 in the U.S. and $30,276,000 on foreign territories, for a $74,134,790 worldwide total.

Reception 
Always has received a 65% rating on Rotten Tomatoes based on 26 reviews, its consensus reads, "Its central romance takes occasional dives into excessive sentimentality, but Always otherwise flies high thanks to director Steven Spielberg's rousing feel for adventure." Metacritic calculated an average score of 50 out of 100 based on 15 reviews, indicating "mixed or average reviews". Audiences polled by CinemaScore gave the film an average grade of "A-" on an A+ to F scale.

Roger Ebert of the Chicago Sun-Times considered it "dated" and more of a "curiosity," calling it Spielberg's "weakest film since his comedy 1941". Variety gave it a more generous review: "Always is a relatively small scale, engagingly casual, somewhat silly, but always entertaining fantasy."

Awards and nominations 
Always was nominated in 1991 for the Saturn Award as Best Fantasy Film, while Jerry Belson was nominated for the Best Writing category of the award at the Academy of Science Fiction, Fantasy & Horror Films (USA). A number of critics have now considered the film as the progenitor of a new crop of "ghost" genre films, including Ghost (1990).

Music 
 The character Pete Sandich, played by Richard Dreyfuss, whistles "Garryowen" and the theme to Leave It to Beaver.
 "Smoke Gets in Your Eyes," performed live in the film by J. D. Souther and played later on tape by The Platters, is what romantic couple Sandich and Durston refers to as "our song".
 The album was released in 1990 and featured tracks of the orchestral score of the film, composed and conducted by John Williams. An expanded edition of Williams' score was released on June 22, 2021 through La-La-Land Records, which includes unreleased and unheard musical contents.
Also featured was Jimmy Buffett's "Boomerang Love".

See also 
 List of firefighting films
 List of films about angels

References

Notes

Citations

Bibliography 

 Crawley, Tony. The Steven Spielberg Story. New York: William Morrow, 1983. .
 Dolan, Edward F. Jr. Hollywood Goes to War. London: Bison Books, 1985. .
 Evans, Alun. Brassey's Guide to War Films. Dulles, Virginia: Potomac Books, 2000. .
 Farmer, James H. "The Making of Always." Air Classics, Volume 26, No. 2, February 1990.
 Freer, Ian. The Complete Spielberg. New York: Virgin Books, 2001. .
 Sinyard, Neil. The Films of Steven Spielberg. London: Bison Books, 1986. .
 Walker, Alexander. Audrey: Her Real Story. London: Weidenfeld & Nicolson, 1997. .
 Woodward, Ian. Audrey Hepburn: Fair Lady of the Screen. London: Virgin Books, 2010. .

External links 

 
 
 
 
 
 

1989 films
1989 fantasy films
1989 romantic drama films
1980s American films
1980s English-language films
1980s fantasy drama films
1980s ghost films
1980s romantic fantasy films
Amblin Entertainment films
American aviation films
American fantasy drama films
American ghost films
American romantic drama films
American romantic fantasy films
Drama film remakes
Fantasy film remakes
Films about angels
Films about aviation accidents or incidents
Films about firefighting
Films about grieving
Films about wildfires
Films directed by Steven Spielberg
Films produced by Frank Marshall
Films produced by Kathleen Kennedy
Films produced by Steven Spielberg
Films scored by John Williams
Films set in Colorado
Films set in Montana
Films shot in Montana
Films shot in Washington (state)
Films with screenplays by Jerry Belson
Remakes of American films
Romance film remakes
United Artists films
Universal Pictures films